Kaduna State ( جىِهَر كَدُنا; ,) is a state in northern Nigeria. The state capital is its namesake, the city of Kaduna which happened to be the 8th largest city in the country as at 2006. Created in 1967 as North-Central State, which also encompassed the modern Katsina State, Kaduna State achieved its current borders in 1987. The fourth largest and third most populous state in the country, Kaduna State is nicknamed the Centre of Learning, owing to the presence of numerous educational institutions of importance within the state such as Ahmadu Bello University.

In the 9th century, geographer and historian Ya'qubi documented the existence of the Hausa Kingdoms, which existed until the region was incorporated into the Sokoto Caliphate in the early 1800s following the Fulani War. During the colonial era, the city of Kaduna was made the capital of Northern Nigeria Protectorate by British leadership.

The name Kaduna is believed to be a corruption of the Hausa word , which means crocodile; the Kaduna River previously hosted a large crocodile population. The state economy is dependent on agriculture, especially cotton and groundnut production. In the modern era, Kaduna State has been the site of violent ethnic and religious conflict, with the 2002 Miss World riots in the state capital over purported blasphemy leading to around 250 deaths and the loss of homes for around 30,000.

Etymology 
The word Kaduna is said to be a corruption of the Hausa language word '"Kada' " for Crocodile and the plural is "Kadduna" for crocodiles, as there were previously many crocodiles in the river of Kaduna. Another version of the etymology of the name is a narrative linked to the Gbagyi word/name 'Odna' for River Kaduna. in the coat of arm of the state, there is a symbol of crocodile, and majority of emblem related to the state uses crocodile as a symbol. The state football club Kaduna United F.C. used "The Crocodiles" as a nickname.

History
It is indicative that the name, Kaduna, was taken up by Lord Frederick Lugard and his colonial colleagues when they moved the capital of the then Northern Region from Zungeru to Kaduna city in 1916. This move of the colonial office to Kaduna city started in 1912–1918/20 with the initial effort having been made in 1902 from Jebba to Zungeru.

At the start of British colonial rule in northern Nigeria the people groups who live in the area became 'Northern Nigerians'- a construct which continues even today. By 1967 these people groups again were carved into 'North Central State'; this was the case until 1975 that 'Kaduna State' was formerly created by the then military leader, Gen. Murtala Mohammed, with all distinct identities amalgamated into one state without a referendum. The state hence is the successor of the old Northern Region of Nigeria, which had its capital at Kaduna which is now the state capital to about 6.3 million people (Nigerian census figure, 2006).

In 1967, the old Northern Region was divided into six states in the north, leaving Kaduna as the capital of North-Central State, whose name was changed to Kaduna State in 1976. Meanwhile, Kaduna State was further divided in 1987, creating Katsina State. Under the governance of Kaduna are the ancient cities of Zaria, Kafanchan, and Nok, the area where Africa's earliest civilization is recorded to have been excavated. The most intriguing aspect of this area is that the colonial construction and its post-colonial successor called 'Nigeria' hardly documented the history or the method of how Kaduna state's people groups encompassed in these constructs define and identify themselves as such the people groups who populate the area have lived in near oblivion or obscurity as they often are thought of as Hausa people. In 2019 Kaduna State celebrated its 100-year anniversary, making it one of the oldest states in Nigeria.

Zazzau is said to have been founded in 1536 and later was renamed after the prominent Queen Zaria known as Amina. The Hausa people of Zaria are said to be the old ancestral of the region.

Geography
The state is located at the Northern part of Nigeria's high plains. The vegetation cover is Sudan Savannah type, characterized by scattered short trees, shrubs and grasses. The soil is mostly loamy to sandy. A substantial amount of clay is found also.

Its northern half became Katsina state in 1987. The state is bordered by seven states. The Kaduna state is located between latitude 10 degree centi 38'58" N and 10 degree centi 25'36" north of the equator to longitude 7 degree centi 22'14" east and 7 degree centi 32'00" east of the Greenwich Meridian.

The state was ranked number four by total area of land and number three by population.

The Kaduna River, a tributary of the Niger River, flows through the state. There are rocky stones in Zaria and Kogoro Hill. Many communities are prone to seasonal flooding during the rainy season.

Government 
The current governor of Kaduna state is legally under the control of Kaduna State Executives, Kaduna State House of Assembly and Kaduna State Judiciary. The current elected governor of the state is Nasir Ahmad el-Rufai and his deputy is Hadiza Sabuwa Balarabe. In the state there 14 ministries that operate with the state government to improve the state: Ministries of Kaduna State. Within each Ministry there are multiple agencies with regulatory authority, such as the Kaduna State Environmental Protection Authority which overseas waste, water, and other environmental quality issues.

The governor of the state said he is trying to restore togetherness back in the state to make it hospitable for all Nigerians just as it has always been in the past. According to him, the city is now divided due to the frequent communal clashes that have been occurring in the last two decades.

Local government areas

Kaduna State consists of 23 local government areas. They are:

Kidnapping 
On 11 March 2021, thirty students were kidnapped in Kaduna State, when gunmen attacked the Federal College of Forestry Mechanization. This was the fourth school kidnapping in Nigeria in 2021, and also the fifth school attack. On 20 April 2021, in another bloody raid by bandits on the students and staffs of the Greenfield University kidnapped 23 students and killed 5 of them. presently, the state is facing securities challenges. The governor is working with all the security personnel to find lasting solutions.

Economics 
The Kaduna State economy was ranked 15th largest state in Nigerian economy from 2002 to 2008, and it made up 3.3% of Nigerian GDP.  While agriculture contributed 30% of SGDP in Kaduna. Kaduna state cultivate cotton and peanuts (groundnuts) for exporting and domestic extraction of Peanut oil. In the state there is National Institute of Leather and Technology, to improve modern technology and traditional method.

Media 
In Kaduna State there are many means of communication through mass media, broadcasting, internet communication and banking transaction. In Kaduna State there are 21 radio stations and more than four television stations broadcasting. Many of them are owned by the state government or federal government, and a few are private. The following is a list of radio stations in Kaduna.

Ethnic groups 
Kaduna State is populated by about 59 to 63 different ethnic groups, if not more, with the exactitude of the number requiring further verification through field work. The question as in the last paragraph with the Hausa and Fulani as the dominant ethnic groups followed by at least 60 others. These groups include:

Religion 
The main religions in Kaduna State are Christianity and Islam. Some minority ethnic groups practice traditional worshiping, mostly in the southern area of the state. The people of Kaduna are very religious, causing two religious crises in 2001 and 2002, the Miss World riots.

Christianity 

Christian mission activities in the area began formally in the 1900s with the establishment of Sudan Interior Mission (SIM) in the Ham town of Har Kwain (Kwoi), hence today these people groups are mainly Christians. Culturally, the people groups of the then southern Zaria who are now Southern Kaduna, with some exception it must be acknowledged, share a lot in the cultural practices of marriage rites, naming, burial, farming, social organisations, kinship, etc. Until full scale research is undertaken, the diversity of Kaduna state remains blurred as some ethnic groups are so small in population that they are often overshadowed by the larger groups who live near them. There are several churches across the state, including the Roman Catholic dioceses of Zaria, Kaduna, Kafachan and megachurches.

Islam 

The central mosque in Kaduna metropolis is known as Sultan Bello Mosque. The Jama't Izalat al Bid’a Wa Iqamat as Sunna and Jamatu Nasril Islam main branch is located in Kaduna metropolis. Also, the prominent Tijaniyyah leader Sheikh Dahiru Usman is in Kaduna. The Nigerian Islamic mover known as Ibrahim Zakzaky has his main branch in Zaria, Kaduna State.

Languages 

Other languages in Kaduna State are Bacama, Firan, and Sambe. Almost all of these languages are spoken in Southern Kaduna.

Education
Kaduna is one of the largest centres of education in Nigeria. The slogan of the state is Center of Learning because of the presence of many institution like Ahmadu Bello University (established 1962). There are many government schools, include primary schools and secondary schools. All secondary schools in Kaduna are owned by the state government, federal government or private organisations. there are many tertiary institutions in the state. The state also has colleges for transportation and agriculture.

Universities and institutes

 Ahmadu Bello University, Zaria
 Air Force Institute of Technology (Nigeria)
 Federal College of Education, Zaria
 Greenfield University Kaduna
 Kaduna Polytechnic (1968), Kaduna
 Kaduna State University
 National Open University of Nigeria, Kaduna Study Center
 Nigerian College of Aviation Technology Zaria
 Nigerian Defence Academy (NDA), Kaduna
 Nuhu Bamalli Polytechnic, Zaria

Secondary schools and colleges

 Barewa College
 Essence International School
 Nigerian Military School

Architecture 

Architecture includes the National Museum which was built in 1975 with archaeological and ethnographic exhibitions, the Kajuru Castle, Lugard Hall, Zaria walls and gates and Nok settlements. In the state there are many architectural buildings like Ahmadu Bello Stadium, Murtala Square, Investment house, Kaduna central market, and Sultan Bello Mosque. The palace of empire of Zazzau is one of the oldest traditional buildings in Kaduna state.

Traditional architecture 

In Kaduna State there are a lot of ethnic groups, which lead to the variation of culture and architectural style, this include the city wall of Zaria. The walls constructed during the reigns of Queen Amina of Zazzau protected the city and they are between 14 and 16 km long, and are closed by eight gates, Also the Emir's Palace of Zaria is an important traditional heritage. The palace has luxurious interiors. The St. Bartholomew's Church Zaria, built by the Church Missionary Society in 1929, still stands in Zaria, the church was built based on Hausa traditional architecture.

Modern architecture 

Modern architecture is present in the state as a result of civilization and development. Most of these architectural buildings were built by the federal or state government, while the residential ones are mostly built by individuals; these buildings include Ahmadu Bello Stadium, Ten storey building, Investment house, federal secretary, Ranchers Bees Stadium, and Murtala square.

Health 
Kaduna State has over 1,000 primary healthcare facilities to cater to every resident, even in the most remote village or ward of the state. To further improve on healthcare delivery, in 2016, the Kaduna State Government partnered with the UK Department for International Development (DFID) to install over 1.3 megawatts of solar power in primary healthcare facilities across the state.

Sports 
In Kaduna State many sports are played, such as football, golf, swimming, traditional wrestling and handball. The Kaduna State government run a football club called Kaduna United F.C. The club participated in playing Nigerian Professional Football League but are under relegation. the state also host Kaduna Marathon .

Entertainment and tourism 
In Kaduna State an annual festival is organized by Ministry of Culture and Tourism (Kaduna State). The festival exposes folklore talent and through these process, to promote unity and encourage tourism and build culture in the State. It takes place every November or December. Cultural activities include Eid al-Fitr and Eid al-Adha performed by the Muslims in the state; the Tuk Ham; the Afan National Festival; the Christmas and Easter celebrations, by Christians, and the Kallan-Kowa celebrations. Kaduna has a museum and a park, the Kofar Gamji park and Zoo. Lord Lugard's Residence, is also a tourist attraction and it currently houses the state assembly.

Environmental issues 
Kaduna State in the North-Central part of Nigeria is prone to the following environmental issues:

Solid waste management

Flooding

Climate Change 

The rainy season in Kaduna is hot, humid, and cloudy, while the dry season is hot and partly cloudy. Throughout the year, the temperature rarely falls below 50 °F or rises above 102 °F, usually ranging between 55 °F and 95 °F.

Entertainment 
 Eid al-Fitr and Eid al-Adha: This celebration is scheduled on the 1st of Shawwal and the 10th of Dhu al-Hijjah respectively according to the Islamic Calendar for three days usually in Kaduna, Usually, Muslims all over the world celebrate the end of the Ramadan fasting period and the conclusion of the hajj (pilgrimage) rites. Most of the emirates in Kaduna State and other parts of the northern Emirates celebrate it with a colourful Hausa traditional dressing, horse decoration and Durbar.
 Christmas celebrations: This takes place in every 25/26 December in Kaduna State to celebrate the birth of Jesus Christ by Christians all over the state.
 Easter celebrations: It takes place every March/April to remember the death and resurrection of Jesus Christ by all Christians in Kaduna State.
 Afan National Festival: This is a celebration on every 1 January, in Kagoro. The festival has assumed an international standard with the sons and daughters of Agworok land coming together to discuss issues that required their attention and to show their extreme cultural heritage.
 Kalankuwa Cultural Festival: It is a purely cultural festival that is celebrated in northern part of the state. It is a celebration to give thanks for good farm crops and to celebrate the season. It is celebrated in November/December. Young men and women come together in a peaceful manner to entertain themselves. It is celebrated in Bomo Village, Samara, in Sabon Gari local government area.

Other small festivals include the following:

 Batadon Festival
 Ayet Atyap annual cultural festival
 Durbar Festival
 Kaduna State Festival of Arts and Culture
 Kafanchan Day
 Kalankuwa Cultural Festival
 Moro’a Cultural Festival
 Ninzo Cultural Festival
 Zunzuk Dance
 Tuk-Ham Festival
 Unum-Akulu Festival

Tourism 

Kamuku National Park
Matsiriga Waterfalls
Kajuru Castle
Arewa House
Murtala Square

Notable people 
 
 
 Umar Farouk Abdulmutallab
 Katung Aduwak
 Martin Luther Agwai
 Gwamna Awan
 Harrison Bungwon
 Bala Ade Dauke
 Joe El
 Maiwada Galadima
 Ahmad Abubakar Gumi
 Chris Delvan Gwamna
 Shehu Idris
 Toure Kazah-Toure
 Matthew Hassan Kukah
 Danjuma Laah
 Zamani Lekwot
 Audu Maikori
 Ahmed Makarfi
 Jonathan Gyet Maude
 Abdulkadir Balarabe Musa
 Nasir Ahmad el-Rufai
 Tagwai Sambo
 Shehu Sani
 Uba Sani
 Ishaya Shekari
 Aisha Ahmad Suleiman
 Sheikh Dahiru Usman
 Patrick Yakowa
 Andrew Yakubu
 Mukhtar Ramalan Yero
 Luka Yusuf
 Ibrahim Zakzaky
 Muhammad Auwal Albani Zaria

Gallery

Politics

The state government is led by a democratical elected governor who works closely with members of the state's house of assembly. The capital city of the state is Kaduna

Electoral System

The governor of each state is selected using a modified two-round system. To be elected in the first round, a candidate must receive the plurality of the vote and over 25% of the vote in at least two -third of the State local government Areas. If no candidate passes threshold, a second round will be held between the top candidate and the next candidate to have received a plurality of votes in the highest number of local government Areas.

See also 
 Kaduna
 Kaduna State Governor
 Kaduna State House of Assembly
 Kaduna State Judiciary
 Ministries of Kaduna State
 Kaduna United F.C.
 Southern Kaduna
 Kaduna kidnapping (disambiguation)

References

Sources
 Nigeria Congress
 Nigeria Exchange

External links
 Kaduna State Media Corporation
 Official State Government website

 
Local Government Areas in Kaduna State
States of Nigeria
States and territories established in 1967
1967 establishments in Nigeria